This article is about the particular significance of the year 1829 to Wales and its people.

Incumbents
Lord Lieutenant of Anglesey – Henry Paget, 1st Marquess of Anglesey 
Lord Lieutenant of Brecknockshire – Henry Somerset, 6th Duke of Beaufort
Lord Lieutenant of Caernarvonshire – Peter Drummond-Burrell, 22nd Baron Willoughby de Eresby 
Lord Lieutenant of Cardiganshire – William Edward Powell
Lord Lieutenant of Carmarthenshire – George Rice, 3rd Baron Dynevor 
Lord Lieutenant of Denbighshire – Sir Watkin Williams-Wynn, 5th Baronet    
Lord Lieutenant of Flintshire – Robert Grosvenor, 1st Marquess of Westminster 
Lord Lieutenant of Glamorgan – John Crichton-Stuart, 2nd Marquess of Bute 
Lord Lieutenant of Merionethshire – Sir Watkin Williams-Wynn, 5th Baronet
Lord Lieutenant of Montgomeryshire – Edward Clive, 1st Earl of Powis
Lord Lieutenant of Pembrokeshire – Sir John Owen, 1st Baronet
Lord Lieutenant of Radnorshire – George Rodney, 3rd Baron Rodney

Bishop of Bangor – Henry Majendie 
Bishop of Llandaff – Edward Copleston 
Bishop of St Asaph – John Luxmoore 
Bishop of St Davids – John Jenkinson

Events
January - The first issue of the Cambrian Quarterly Magazine and Celtic Repertory appears.
6 May - The Cymmrodorion hold an eisteddfod in London.
24 November - The Ecclesiastical Courts Act, 1829, is passed, largely at the instigation of Sir John Nicholl.
Formation of the North Wales and South Wales MMs (monthly meetings) by the Society of Friends.
Beaumaris Gaol is built, to the design of Joseph Hansom.

Arts and literature

New books
Ellis Evans - Arddangosiad Syml o Syniadau Gwahaniaethol, neu Egwyddorion Priodol, y Bedyddwyr Crediniol
John Jones (Tegid) - A Defence of the Reformed System of Welsh Orthography
Thomas Love Peacock - The Misfortunes of Elphin
Thomas Price (Carnhuanawc) - An Essay on the Physiognomy and Physiology of the Present Inhabitants of Britain

Music
Felix Mendelssohn visits Wales and transcribes some Welsh music.

Births
27 January - Isaac Roberts, astronomer (d. 1904)
28 August - Samuel C. Hughes, Welsh-born American businessman and politician (d. 1917)
20 December - Morgan Jones, cricketer (d. 1905)
23 December - Thomas Walter Price (Cuhelyn), journalist and poet (d. 1869)
unknown date - G. Phillips Bevan, statistician (d. 1889)

Deaths
26 January - Benjamin Millingchamp, collector of manuscripts, 72
June - Elizabeth Randles, harpist, 28?
19 August - Jonathan Williams, antiquary, 77
20 November - John Jenkins (Ifor Ceri), antiquary, 59

References

Wales
 Wales